Barkaboom Mountain is a mountain located in the Catskill Mountains of New York southwest of Margaretville. Touchmenot Mountain is located southwest of Barkaboom Mountain and Cross Mountain is located northeast.

References

Mountains of Delaware County, New York
Mountains of New York (state)